The Izembek National Wildlife Refuge is the smallest of the National Wildlife Refuges located in the U.S. state of Alaska. It lies on the northwest (Bering Sea) coastal side of central Aleutians East Borough. Almost all of the refuge ( out of ) was designated as wilderness in 1980 under the Alaska National Interest Lands Conservation Act (Anilca). The refuge is administered from offices in Cold Bay.

Izembek National Wildlife Refuge lies between the highly productive waters of the Bering Sea and the Gulf of Alaska. More than 200 species of wildlife and nine species of fish can be found on the refuge. Millions of migratory waterfowl and shorebirds find food and shelter in the coastal lagoons and freshwater wetlands on their way to and from their subarctic and arctic breeding grounds. This extraordinary abundance and diversity of waterfowl has attracted international attention. In 1986, Izembek National Wildlife Refuge and Izembek State Game Refuge, which encompasses the submerged land of Izembek Lagoon, was the first wetland area in the United States to be recognized as a Wetland of International Importance by the Ramsar Convention. In 2001, Izembek Refuge was also designated as a Globally Important Bird Area by the National Audubon Society.

Attempts have been made to build a road through the refuge connecting the towns of King Cove to Cold Bay. Environmentalists contended the road threatens the population of the migratory black brant and other species. This attempted land transfer was ultimately blocked by the Department of the Interior in 2013.

In January 2018 the Trump administration proposed a different land transfer agreement. Nine environmental groups sued the administration one week later, arguing that the four-year environmental impact statement commissioned by the Department of the Interior had already determined that the road was unnecessary and would irreversibly damage the refuge. A ruling on March 29, 2019 by the United States District Court for the District of Alaska once again blocked the land transfer, finding that the Trump administration's attempts to remove acreage from the refuge contradicted the existing environmental impact statement and made no attempt to explain why the statement was no longer applicable. A second judge rejected a revised plan in June 2020. In November 2022, the U.S. Court of Appeals, Ninth District, overruled a 3-judge panel of the court and scheduled a rehearing of the case against the Trump administration proposal. In an unusual action, former President Jimmy Carter filed a statement of support for the motion for the rehearing, saying the swap violated Anilca. The act "may be the most significant domestic achievement of my political life", Carter said at the time of his filing.

Fauna 
Izembek Wilderness hosts a quarter-million migratory birds every fall, including the entire world's population of black brants and thousands of Canada and emperor geese, Steller's eiders, and various species of duck and shorebird. Izembek Lagoon contains one of the largest eelgrass beds in the world, providing food and shelter for the birds. Tundra swans live on the refuge year-round and thousands of gray, minke, and orca whales migrate along the coast. Hundreds of thousands of salmon spawn in the wilderness. Other common wildlife in the wilderness include brown bear, seal, walrus, Steller's sea lion, sea otter, and caribou from the Southern Alaska Peninsula herd.

Mammals that roam this refuge include brown bears, red foxes and caribou. Raptors which prey on the many species of rodents, birds, and fish in this area include bald and golden eagles, rough-legged hawks, gyrfalcons, and Peale's peregrine falcons. Marine mammals are common in the productive waters surrounding this refuge. Harbor seals, Steller's sea lions, and sea otters inhabit nearby coastal waters and lagoons. Harbor seals frequently haul out on sandbars in the lagoons and along the coast. Orcas, gray whales, and minke whales can sometimes be seen as they migrate along the shoreline and occasionally inside of Izembek Lagoon.

References

External links
 Official site
 New York Times article on Land Swap
Important Bird Areas-National Audubon Society

National Wildlife Refuges in Alaska
Protected areas of Aleutians East Borough, Alaska
Ramsar sites in the United States
Wetlands of Alaska
Landforms of Aleutians East Borough, Alaska
Wilderness areas of Alaska